Auriculella is a genus of air-breathing tropical land snails, terrestrial pulmonate gastropod mollusks in the family Achatinellidae. They are endemic to Hawaii (United States) and several species are extinct. They are oviparous (egg laying) and hermaphroditic. Among achatinellid snails, they are unique in the fact that they are not restricted to living on plants endemic to the Hawaiian islands. They have been known to relatively thrive on non-native plants such as ginger and night jasmine.

Auriculella is the type genus of the subfamily Auriculellinae.

Species
Species within the genus Auriculella include:
 Auriculella auricula
 Auriculella ambusta
 Auriculella brunnea
 Auriculella castanea
 Auriculella canalifera
 Auriculella cerea
 Auriculella crassula
 Auriculella diaphana
†Auriculella expansa
 Auriculella perpeusilla
 Auriculella flavida
 Auriculella malleata
 Auriculella minuta
 Auriculella newcombi
 Auriculella perpusilla
 Auriculella perversa
 Auriculella pulchra
 Auriculella olivacea
 Auriculella tenella
 †Auriculella uniplicata

References

 
Achatinellidae
Taxonomy articles created by Polbot